Wilhelm Anton Souchon (2 June 1864 – 13 January 1946) was a German admiral in World War I. Souchon commanded the Kaiserliche Marines Mediterranean squadron in the early days of the war. His initiatives played a major part in the entry of the Ottoman Empire into World War I.

Biography

Early life and career
Wilhelm Anton Souchon was born on 2 June 1864 in Leipzig Saxony, to a family of Huguenot ancestry. His father was an artist and his mother the daughter of a Berlin banker.

Souchon entered the Imperial German Naval Academy in 1881. After graduation he served on board the corvette Leipzig when it participated in the coastal colonisation of German South-West Africa in 1884. In 1884 Souchon, with the rank of Kapitän, had risen to command a training ship specialising in mine laying techniques.

Between 1884 and 1903 Souchon progressed through several sea going and staff positions, reaching the rank of Korvettenkapitän in what was a steadily expanding navy. In 1904 he was appointed as chief of staff to a cruiser squadron 
stationed in East Asia. He undertook a number of diplomatic and liaison assignments in Japan, China and the Dutch East Indies.

Returning to Europe Souchon took up senior staff duties in the Office of the Imperial Navy in Berlin. After serving as chief of staff for the Baltic naval squadron he reached the ranks of Konteradmiral in April 1911 and Rear Admiral of the High Sea Fleet six months later.

Role in World War I
In July 1914, hostilities erupted between the Austro-Hungarian Empire and the Kingdom of Serbia. Rear Admiral Souchon, feared being trapped in the Adriatic Sea in the event of other nations joining in the conflict. Because of this, Souchon took his two ships, the battlecruiser  and the light cruiser , into the western Mediterranean. When World War I began on 4 August 1914, he bombarded the French-Algerian ports of Bône and Philippeville. He successfully eluded British attempts to corner him (see Pursuit of Goeben and Breslau) and on 10 August 1914, his small squadron arrived at the Dardanelles.

After two days of negotiations, he was allowed to take his ships to Istanbul where they were subsequently transferred officially into the Ottoman Navy. Souchon was appointed Commander-in-chief of the Ottoman Navy and served in this position until September 1917. This gesture by Germany had an enormously positive impact with the Turkish population. At the outbreak of the war, Winston Churchill caused outrage when he "requisitioned" without compensation two almost completed Turkish battleships in British shipyards, Sultan Osman I and Reshadieh, that had been financed by public subscription. On 15 August 1914, in the aftermath of Souchon's daring dash to Constantinople, Turkey cancelled their maritime agreement with Britain and the Royal Navy mission under Admiral Limpus, and left by 15 September.

The Dardanelles were fortified with German assistance and the Bosporus was secured by the presence of Goeben (now Yavuz Sultan Selim). On 27 September 1914, the Straits were officially closed to all international shipping.

On 29 October 1914, Souchon's fleet launched the Black Sea Raid, a naval attack which brought the Ottoman Empire into World War I. His ships laid several sea minefields and shelled the Russian Black Sea ports of Sevastopol, Odessa, and others, destroying the Russian minesweeper, Prut, in the process. British naval units quickly retaliated on Turkish merchant ships off İzmir. On 2 November 1914, Russia declared war on the Ottoman Empire. On 5 November, Britain followed suit and on 12 November 1914, the Ottoman government officially declared war on the Triple Entente.

For the next three years, Souchon attempted to reform the Ottoman Navy while conducting a number of raids on Russian shipping, ports, and coastal installations in the Black Sea. Promoted to vice admiral, Souchon was awarded the Pour le Mérite, Germany's highest military order, on 29 October 1916.

In September 1917, Souchon returned to Germany. There he received command of the Fourth Battleship Squadron of the High Seas Fleet during Operation Albion. Thereafter he was promoted to Admiral. By the end of the war, he was commanding officer of the Imperial Navy base at Kiel.

At the outbreak of the Kiel mutiny on 3 November 1918, Souchon asked for outside troops, but revoked his request for military help when his staff claimed the situation was under control. Souchon had been deployed to Kiel a few days earlier on 30 October 1918, and had therefore to rely heavily on his staff. On 4 November, the request had to be renewed. Altogether six infantry companies were brought to Kiel. Some units stayed in the city quarter Wik, and in the Marinestation der Ostsee. However, these troops showed signs of disintegration and some joined the revolutionaries. Souchon had to negotiate and order the withdrawal of the units. In the course of the events, Souchon stepped down as governor and was replaced by the civilian social democratic politician, Gustav Noske.

Final years
In 1919 Souchon retired from a navy that had ceased to exist. During his remaining years he appears to have avoided involvement either in politics or in the recreation of the German Navy under the Nazi regime.

Admiral Souchon died in Bremen on 13 January 1946.

Legacy
Souchon's nephew, Hermann Souchon (1894–1982), was the assassin of Rosa Luxemburg.

References

External links

 FirstWorldWar.com: Wilhelm Souchon
 An essay on Admiral Souchon
 

1864 births
1946 deaths
Military personnel from Leipzig
People from the Kingdom of Saxony
German people of French descent
Imperial German Navy admirals of World War I
Ottoman Empire admirals
Fleet Commanders of the Ottoman Navy
Ottoman military personnel of World War I
Recipients of the Pour le Mérite (military class)
Vice admirals of the Imperial German Navy